Jacek Jędruch (Warsaw, Poland, 1927 – Athens, Greece, 1995) was a Polish-American nuclear engineer and historian of Polish representative government.

Life
During World War II, Jędruch participated in the Polish Resistance movement.  After the war, he escaped communist security forces by making his way to the West. He traveled to England and from there emigrated to the United States.

He earned degrees from Northwestern University and the Massachusetts Institute of Technology, and a Ph.D. from Pennsylvania State University.

While his vocation was nuclear technology, his avocation was the study of representative governments, the evolution of government policy in relation to public needs, and political developments in Central Europe.  This combination of interests prompted him to write a guide to Polish parliamentary history (first edition 1982, second edition 1997).

He was at work on the second edition when in March 1995, while traveling in Greece with his wife Ewa, a chemical engineer, he suffered a fatal accident at the Acropolis in Athens. Working from Jędruch's notes, his wife Ewa completed the second edition of his book.

Works
Constitutions, Elections, and Legislatures of Poland, 1493-1977:  a Guide to Their History, University Press of America, 1982.
Nuclear Engineering Data Bases, Standards, and Numerical Analysis, Van Nostrand Reinhold, 1985.
Constitutions, Elections, and Legislatures of Poland, 1493-1993:  a Guide to Their History, Summit, NJ, EJJ Books, distributed by Hippocrene Books, 1997.

See also
List of Poles

References

1927 births
1995 deaths
Historians of Poland
Polish engineers
Polish political scientists
20th-century Polish historians
Polish male non-fiction writers
Polish resistance members of World War II
Nuclear engineers
American nuclear engineers
20th-century American engineers
20th-century political scientists